Wilt is a comedic novel by Tom Sharpe, first published by Secker and Warburg in 1976. Later editions were published by Pan Books, and Overlook TP. The novel was a bestseller. Its success led to the author writing several sequels. The descriptions of teaching in the novel are drawn from Sharpe's own experience as a lecturer at the Cambridgeshire College of Arts and Technology.

Plot introduction
Henry Wilt is a demoralized and professionally under-rated assistant lecturer who teaches literature to uninterested construction apprentices at a community college in East Anglia. Years of henpecking and harassment by his physically powerful but emotionally immature wife Eva leave him with dreams of killing her in various gruesome ways. But a string of unfortunate events (including one involving an inflatable plastic female doll) start Henry on a farcical journey. Along the way he finds humiliation and chaos, which ultimately lead him to discover his own strengths and some level of dignity. All the while he is pursued by the tenacious police inspector Flint, whose plodding skills of detection and deduction interpret Wilt's often bizarre actions as heinous crimes.

Characters 
 Henry Wilt
 Eva Wilt
 Inspector Flint
 Sergeant Yates
 Sally Pringsheim
 Gaskell Pringsheim
 Mr. Morris, Head of Liberal Studies
 Peter Braintree, lecturer in English
 Dr. Board
 Dr. Mayfield
 Reverend St. John Froude

Adaptations 
 In 1989 the novel was adapted for the film Wilt (titled The Misadventures of Mr. Wilt in North America).
 The book was released in two audiobook formats: abridged by HarperCollins Audio Books and read by Andrew Sachs, and unabridged by ISIS Audio Books and read by Nigel Graham.

Sequels 
Tom Sharpe wrote several sequels and additional works featuring Henry Wilt:

 The Wilt Alternative (1979)
 Wilt on High (1984)
 Wilt Omnibus (1996 collection of the first three Wilt novels)
 Wilt in Nowhere (2004)
 The Wilt Inheritance (2010)

References

1976 British novels
British comedy novels
British novels adapted into films
Novels by Tom Sharpe
Secker & Warburg books